Jaunpur is a constituency of the Uttar Pradesh Legislative Assembly covering the city of Jaunpur in the Jaunpur district of Uttar Pradesh, India.

Jaunpur is one of five assembly constituencies in the Jaunpur Lok Sabha constituency. Since 2008, this assembly constituency is numbered 366 amongst 403 constituencies.

Election results

2022 Jaunpur Assembly

2017
Bharatiya Janta Party candidate Girish Chandra Yadav won in 2017 Uttar Pradesh Legislative Elections defeating Indian National Congress candidate Nadeem Javed by a margin of 12,284 votes.

References

External links
 

Assembly constituencies of Uttar Pradesh
Jaunpur, Uttar Pradesh
Politics of Jaunpur district